FOS Open Scouting or FOS is a pluralistic, internationally oriented, coeducational, Flemish Scout and Guide organisation in Belgium  and is a member of the Guidisme et Scoutisme en Belgique/Gidsen- en Scoutsbeweging in België (GSB, Guides and Scouts Movement of Belgium). FOS is a federation of 58 Scout Groups.

History
The first pluralistic Boy Scouts organisation in Belgium was the "Boy-Scouts de Belgique" (B.S.B.) founded in 1910. 1913 was the "Sea Scouts of Belgium" (S.S.B) and in 1914 "Eclaireurs de Belgique" (E.B.) founded. In 1916 the S.S.B and the E.B. merged with the B.S.B..  In the same year was the "Girl-Guides van België" (G.G.B.) founded, the first pluralistic Girl Guide organisation. 1945 the B.S.B. and the G.G.B. merged to form the Boy-Scouts en Girl-Guides van België (B.S.B.-G.G.B.). 1966 the B.S.B.-G.G.B. split in a Flemish organisation, "Federatie voor Open Scoutisme" (F.O.S.) and a Walloon organisation, "Fédération des Eclaireuses et Eclaireurs" (F.E.E.), later renamed to Scouts et Guides Pluralistes de Belgique (S.G.P.). In 1999 dropped F.O.S. the periods and renamed to "FOS Open Scouting".

Sections

Foundations

 Values: Law & Promise, Engagement, Teamwork, Service, Self-reliance, Self-governing, Openness (active pluralism), Co-education
 Playgrounds: Outdoor live, exploration, sport & games, culture & creativity, techniques, reflection & society
 Methods: Patrol system, Symbolic framework, Personal progression, Living in nature, Learning by doing, Adult support
FOS is more traditional than the Scouts en Gidsen Vlaanderen and actively uses Class badges.

Active pluralism
All children and young people from 6 years are welcome in FOS. Race, social origin, nationality, sexual orientation, physical or cultural differences is never a basis for refusal. Also are people with any philosophical, religious or political conviction welcome as long as these principles are compatible with the vision of Open Scouting. FOS believes that a conviction is never finished, that you have to accept that a different view can and may have consequences and that you basically always have to be willing to review your vision and possibly amend it. FOS encourages a respectful dialogue about the various forms of spirituality in society. This confrontation of ideas is believed to enrich the spiritual choices of the members.

The promise of the FOS makes no reference to a god or a religion only to a higher ideal.
I promise, on my honour, to try:
To be loyal to a higher ideal, our group and democracy
To obey the guides/scouts law
To help where possible

See also
 Scouting in Belgium

References

World Association of Girl Guides and Girl Scouts member organizations
World Organization of the Scout Movement member organizations
Scouting and Guiding in Belgium
Youth organizations established in 1910